Marmara (sometimes "Nor Marmara" - New Marmara) is an Armenian-language daily newspaper published since August 31 1940 in Istanbul, Turkey. It was established by Armenian journalist and foreign correspondent Souren Shamlian. Initially a weekly newspaper, it was soon published daily due to intense interest.  Following Shamlian's death in 1951 his daughter and her husband, Seta and Bedros Zobyan, took over the paper. When the Zobyans left Istanbul for Canada in 1967, they left the paper to Rober Haddeciyan (also known as Robert Haddeler), a writer and journalist who was already working for the paper.

Marmara uses the Western Armenian language and traditional Mesrobian spelling. It is published six times a week (except on Sundays). The Friday edition contains a section in Turkish as well. Circulation is reported at 2500 per issue.

External links
Marmara official website

1940 establishments in Turkey
Newspapers published in Istanbul
Newspapers established in 1940
Armenian-language newspapers
Daily newspapers published in Turkey